Staple Hill is the name of three places in England:
 Staple Hill, Somerset, a 315 m ridge in the Blackdown Hills largely within Staple Fitzpaine
 Staple Hill, South Gloucestershire, suburb of Bristol with ward status, and small hill
 Staple Hill, Chobham Common, Chobham, Surrey, a hill